Helland-Hansen Shoulder is a mainly ice-covered ridge which extends southward from the west portion of Mount Fridtjof Nansen and overlooks the northern side of the head of Axel Heiberg Glacier in Antarctica. It was discovered in 1911 by Roald Amundsen and named by him for Professor Bjørn Helland-Hansen, of the University of Oslo, Norway.

References

Latitude:	852600S
Longitude:	1681000W
Description:	A mainly ice-covered ridge which extends southward from the west portion of Mount Fridtjof Nansen and overlooks the northern side of the head of Axel Heiberg Glacier. Discovered in 1911 by Roald Armundsen and named by him for Prof. B. Helland-Hansen, of the University of Oslo, Norway.

Ridges of the Ross Dependency
Amundsen Coast